Albert Kolyn (born November 13, 1932) is a former politician in Ontario, Canada.  He served in the Legislative Assembly of Ontario from 1981 to 1985 as a member of the Progressive Conservative Party.

Background
Kolyn was born in Fort William, and was educated in the city. He later moved to Toronto, where he worked as a businessman.  Kolyn was an active freemason, and a member of the Ukrainian National Federation.

Politics
He ran for the Ontario legislature in the 1977 provincial election, and lost to Pat Lawlor of the New Democratic Party (NDP) by 5,295 votes in Lakeshore.  He then contested Etobicoke—Lakeshore in the 1979 federal election as a candidate of the Progressive Conservative Party of Canada, and lost to Liberal Ken Robinson by only 747 votes in a close three-way race.  He campaigned federally again in the 1980 election, and this time lost to Robinson by 4,694 votes.

Kolyn was elected to the Ontario legislature in the 1981 provincial election, defeating NDP newcomer Don Sullivan by 1,232 votes.  He served as a backbench supporter of the William Davis and Frank Miller ministries for the next four years.

The Progressive Conservatives lost several seats in the 1985 provincial election, and Kolyn was personally defeated in Lakeshore.  He finished third out of three candidates, losing to New Democrat Ruth Grier by 3,653 votes.  He attempted a comeback in the 1987 election, and finished a distant third against Grier.

Electoral record

References

External links

1932 births
Living people
Politicians from Thunder Bay
Progressive Conservative Party of Ontario MPPs